Zarasai District Municipality is one of 60 municipalities in Lithuania. It borders with Latvia and Belarus.

It has significant Russian minority population in Lithuania, with sixth of the population claiming Russian ethnicity.

Local government units
The district has the following localities:
 2 cities (miestas): Zarasai (capital) and Dusetos
 3 towns (miestelis): Antalieptė, Salakas, and Turmantas
 about 800 rural settlements (villages and single-family farmsteads)

Biggest population (2001):
 Zarasai – 8365
 Dusetos – 2054
 Salakas – 604
 Dimitriškės – 470
 Antazavė – 461
 Turmantas – 397
 Aviliai – 373
 Antalieptė – 359
 Degučiai – 324

Geography and attractions
30% of the territory is covered by forests (about 65% of those are pine forests), about 10% by lakes. The district has about 300 lakes. The most famous lake is Lake Sartai for its winter horse races. Part of the biggest lake in Lithuania, Lake Drūkšiai, is also in the district. Other three lakes are among the ten largest lakes in Lithuania. There are 20 artificial lakes, the biggest one is Antalieptė Lagoon. It is a unique artificial lake in Lithuania. It was formed when a dam on Šventoji River was built and 27 different lakes joined to form one lagoon. It has about 50 islands. There are 8 rivers, the longest is Šventoji River (almost 45 km in the district). The district has two regional parks, Sartai and Gražutė.

The district is rich in beautiful nature and could become a tourist destination. However, the geographic location is very inconvenient. Zarasai district municipality is away from major highways. Also, it is quite far away from the capital, Vilnius. Vilnians would rather choose numerous lakes in Molėtai district municipality or Aukštaitija National Park for recreation.

The district has many hill forts built in the 9-12th centuries. They were used for defence against Livonian Order attacking from Daugavpils.

Stelmužė Oak, the oldest tree in Lithuania, grows in the district.

Nature and geography

References

 
Municipalities of Utena County
Municipalities of Lithuania